Plastiglomerate is a rock made of a mixture of sedimentary grains, and other natural debris (e.g. shells, wood) that is held together by plastic. It has been considered a potential marker of the Anthropocene, an informal epoch of the Quaternary proposed by some social scientists, environmentalists, and geologists.

Origin
Plastiglomerates form along shorelines where natural sedimentary grains and organic debris are agglutinated by melted plastic created during campfire burning. They have been reported from Kamilo Beach on the island of Hawaii.

Depositional environment
Plastiglomerate could potentially form a marker horizon of human pollution on the geologic record. and may survive as future fossils. Plastiglomerate may also conceivably form in plastic-polluted regions affected by lava flows or forest fires. They have been found on the surface as well as beneath the sand. This suggests that plastiglomerates are being actively deposited into the sedimentary record. Some geophysicists and geologists speculate that plastiglomerates will not persist in the fossil record, however, or that they might " to a source of oil from whence they came, given the right conditions of burial".

"In situ" plastiglomerate forms where plastic melts and fills in rock cavities. "Clastic" plastiglomerate are smaller solitary pieces that form where larger fused items become fragmented by waves. Plastiglomerate is more dense than particles that are solely composed of plastic, which gives them greater potential to become buried and preserved in the rock record.

 Plastiglomerates have been featured at the Yale Peabody Museum of Natural History; Oakville Galleries in Oakville, Ontario, Canada; Louis B. James Gallery in New York City; Carleton University Gallery in Ottawa, Ontario, Canada; Prosjektrom Normanns, Stavanger, Norway; and Museon in The Hague, Netherlands. Museon claims to have probably the largest piece of plastiglomerate, which is more than 1m long and 50cm wide.

History
Charles Moore, a sea captain and oceanographer for the Algalita Marine Research Institute in Long Beach, California, discovered this substance in 2006 while surveying Kamilo Beach on the Big Island of Hawai’i. Geology professor, Dr. Patricia Corcoran and Visual artist professor, Kelly Jazvac of the University of Western Ontario investigated the samples on Kamilo Beach in 2012 where they also coined the term "plastiglomerate". Approximately one-fifth of the plastiglomerates found at Kamilo Beach consisted of fishing debris, one quarter consisted of broken lid containers, and one half consisted of plastic "confetti". The plastiglomerate at Kamilo Beach was more likely created from human campfires than from molten lava flows. In 2023, it was reported plastiglomerates had been discovered on remote Trindade Island, a known refuge for turtles.

See also
 Plastic pollution

References

Further reading

Anthropology
Archaeology
Plastics and the environment
Pollution
Sedimentary rocks